Prawat Wahoram (born 24 March 1981) is a Paralympian athlete from Thailand competing in category T54 wheelchair racing events. He competed for Thailand in six Paralympic Games from 2000 to 2020 and got the total of seven gold, eight silver, and one bronze medals. He is considered the most successful Thai Paralympic athlete.

Biography
Competing in wheelchair athletics, Wahoram has represented Thailand at the Paralympic Games on six occasions. He won his first medals, two gold, at the 2000 Summer Paralympics in Sydney, winning the 5000 m and 10000 m races in the T54 category.

Wahoram competed in the 2004 Summer Paralympics at various distances, the 800 m, 1500 m, 5000 m and 10000 m race. He won an individual silver in the 10000 m race, as well as two gold medals in team events in the 4 × 100 m and 4 × 400 m relays.

At the 2008 Summer Paralympics, he won a gold medal in the 5000 metres event as well as three silver and one bronze medals.

Major results

References

External links
 
 

Prawat Wahoram
Prawat Wahoram
Prawat Wahoram
Prawat Wahoram
Prawat Wahoram
Athletes (track and field) at the 2000 Summer Paralympics
Athletes (track and field) at the 2004 Summer Paralympics
Athletes (track and field) at the 2008 Summer Paralympics
Athletes (track and field) at the 2012 Summer Paralympics
Athletes (track and field) at the 2016 Summer Paralympics
Athletes (track and field) at the 2020 Summer Paralympics
Medalists at the 2000 Summer Paralympics
Medalists at the 2004 Summer Paralympics
Medalists at the 2008 Summer Paralympics
Medalists at the 2012 Summer Paralympics
Medalists at the 2016 Summer Paralympics
Medalists at the 2020 Summer Paralympics
World Para Athletics Championships winners
Paralympic medalists in athletics (track and field)
1981 births
Living people
Prawat Wahoram
Prawat Wahoram